Mississippi was the second southern state to declare its secession from the United States, doing so on January 9, 1861. It joined with six other southern states to form the Confederacy on February 4, 1861. Mississippi's location along the lengthy Mississippi River made it strategically important to both the Union and the Confederacy; dozens of battles were fought in the state as armies repeatedly clashed near key towns and transportation nodes.

Mississippian troops fought in every major theater of the American Civil War, although most were concentrated in the Western Theater. Confederate president  Jefferson Davis was a Mississippi politician and operated a large cotton plantation there. Prominent Mississippian generals during the war included William Barksdale, Carnot Posey, Wirt Adams, Earl Van Dorn, Robert Lowry, and Benjamin G. Humphreys.

Secession and Mississippian politics
For years prior to the American Civil War, slave-holding Mississippi had voted heavily for the Democrats, especially as the Whigs declined in their influence. During the 1860 presidential election, the state supported Southern Democrat candidate John C. Breckinridge, giving him 40,768 votes (59.0% of the total of 69,095 ballots cast). John Bell, the candidate of the Constitutional Union Party, came in a distant second with 25,045 votes (36.25% of the total), with Stephen A. Douglas, a northern Democrat, receiving 3,282 votes (4.75%). Abraham Lincoln, who won the national election, was not on the ballot in Mississippi. According to one Mississippian newspaper in the late 1850s:

Long a hotbed of secessionist sentiment, support for slavery, and southern states' rights, Mississippi declared its secession from the United States on January 9, 1861, two months after the Republican Party's victory in the U.S. presidential election. The state then joined the Confederacy less than a month later, issuing a declaration of their reasons for seceding, proclaiming that "[o]ur position is thoroughly identified with the institution of slavery--the greatest material interest of the world". Fulton Anderson, a Mississippian lawyer, delivered a speech to the Virginian secession convention in 1861, in which he declared that "grievances of the Southern people on the slavery question" and their opposition to the Republican Party's goal of "the ultimate extinction of slavery" were the primary catalysts of the state in declaring secession. Mississippian judge Alexander Hamilton Handy also shared this view, opining of the "black" Republican Party that:

Along with South Carolina, Mississippi was one of only two states in the Union in 1860 in which the majority of the state's population were slaves. According to Mississippian Democrat and future Confederate leader Jefferson Davis, Mississippi joined the Confederacy because it "has heard proclaimed the theory that all men are created free and equal", a sentiment perceived as being threatening to slavery, and because the "Declaration of Independence has been invoked to maintain the position of the equality of the races", a position that Davis was opposed to.

William L. Harris, one Mississippian secession commissioner, told a meeting of the Georgian general assembly that the Republicans wanted to implement "equality between the white and negro races" and thus secession was necessary for the slave states to resist their efforts.

Fulton Anderson, another Mississippian, told the Virginian secession convention that the Republicans were hostile to the slave states themselves, thus accusing the Republican Party of having an "unrelenting and eternal hostility to the institution of slavery."

Enlistment
There were small pockets of Unionist citizens who remained sympathetic to the Union in Mississippi, most famously "The Free State of Jones" in Jones County, led by Newton Knight. The vast majority of white Mississippians embraced slavery and the Confederate cause, with thousands joining the Confederate military. Around 80,000 white Mississippians served in the Confederate Army; whereas some 545 white Mississippians would join Union Forces. 

As the war progressed, a considerable number of freed or escaped slaves joined the United States Colored Troops and similar black regiments. More than 17,000 black Mississippian slaves and freedmen fought for the Union.  

There were regional variations, as Logue shows. almost all soldiers were volunteers. The likelihood of a man volunteering for service increased with a person's amount of personal property owned, including slaves. Poor men were less likely to volunteer. Men living near the Mississippi River, regardless of their wealth or other characteristics, were less likely to join the army than were those living in the state's interior. Many military-age men in these western counties had moved elsewhere. Union control of the Mississippi River made its neighbors especially vulnerable, and river-county residents apparently left their communities (and often the Confederacy) rather than face invasion.

Emancipation of slaves

Portions of northwestern Mississippi were under Union control on January 1, 1863, when the Emancipation Proclamation went into effect. All of Mississippi had been declared "in rebellion" in the Proclamation, and Union forces accordingly began to free slaves in the U.S.-controlled areas of Mississippi at once. According to one Confederate lieutenant from Mississippi, slavery was the cause for which the state declared secession from the Union, saying that "This country without slave labor would be completely worthless ... We can only live & exist by that species of labor: and hence I am willing to fight to the last."

Mississippian towns during the war

Corinth
Corinth's location at the junction of two railroads made it strategically important. Confederate General P.G.T. Beauregard retreated there after the Battle of Shiloh, pursued by Union Maj. Gen. Henry W. Halleck. Beauregard abandoned the town when Halleck approached, letting it fall into Union hands. Since Halleck approached so cautiously, digging entrenchments at every stop for over a month, this action has been known as the Siege of Corinth.

Maj. Gen. William Rosecrans moved to Corinth as well and concentrated his force with Halleck later in the year to again attack the city. The Battle of Corinth took place on October 3–4, 1862, when Confederate Maj. Gen. Earl Van Dorn attempted to retake the city. The Confederate troops won back the city but were quickly forced out when Union reinforcements arrived.

Oxford

On August 22, 1864 the city of Oxford, MS was burned to the ground by General A.J. Smith. Only the University of Mississippi and two shops were left standing. This action was taken because Nathan Bedford Forrest had taken refuge in Oxford.

Jackson
Despite its small population, Jackson became a strategic center of manufacturing for the Confederacy. In 1863, during the campaign which ended in the capture of Vicksburg, Union forces captured Jackson during two battles—once before the fall of Vicksburg and again soon after its fall.

On May 13, 1863, Union forces won the first Battle of Jackson, forcing Confederate forces to flee northward towards Canton. Subsequently, on May 15 Union troops under William Tecumseh Sherman burned and looted key facilities in Jackson. After driving the Confederates out of Jackson, Union forces turned west once again and soon placed Vicksburg under siege.  Confederates began to reassemble in Jackson in preparation for an attempt to break through the Union lines now surrounding Vicksburg. Confederates marched out of Jackson to break the siege in early July. However, unknown to them, Vicksburg had already surrendered on July 4. Union Army general Ulysses S. Grant dispatched Sherman to meet the Confederate forces. Upon learning that Vicksburg had already surrendered, the Confederates retreated back into Jackson, thus beginning the Siege of Jackson, which lasted for approximately one week before the town fell.

Natchez
During the American Civil War, the Mississippian city of Natchez remained largely undamaged. The city surrendered to Flag-Officer David G. Farragut after the fall of New Orleans in May 1862.  One civilian, an elderly man, was killed during the war, when in September 1863, a Union ironclad shelled the town from the river and he promptly died of a heart attack. Union soldiers sent by Ulysses S. Grant from Vicksburg occupied Natchez in 1863. The local commander, General Thomas Ransom, established headquarters at a home called Rosalie.

Ellen Shields's memoir reveals a Confederate woman's reactions to Union occupation of the city. Shields was a member of the local elite and her memoir points to the upheaval of Confederate society during the war. According to historian Joyce Broussard, Shields's memoir indicates that Confederate men, absent because of the war, were seen to have failed in their homes and in the wider community, forcing the women to use their class-based femininity and their sexuality to deal with the Union Army.

The 340 planters who each owned 250 or more slaves in the Natchez region in 1860 were not enthusiastic Confederates. The support these slaveholders had for the Confederacy was problematic because they were fairly recent arrivals to the Confederacy, opposed secession, and held social and economic ties to the Union. These elite planters also lacked a strong emotional attachment to the idea of a Southern nation; however, when the war started, many of their sons and nephews joined the Confederate army.  On the other hand, Charles Dahlgren arrived from Philadelphia and made his fortune before the war. He did support the Confederacy and led a brigade, but was sharply criticized for failing to defend the Gulf Coast. When the Union Army came he moved to Georgia for the duration. He returned in 1865 but never recouped his fortune; He went bankrupt and in 1870 he gave up and moved to New York City.

A few residents showed their defiance of Union authorities. In 1864, the Catholic bishop of the Diocese of Natchez, William Henry Elder, refused to obey a Union order to compel his parishioners to pray for the U.S. president. In response, Union forces arrested Elder, convicted him, and jailed him briefly.

The memory of the war remains important for the city, as white Natchez became much more pro-Confederate after the war. The Lost Cause myth arose as a means for coming to terms with the Confederacy's defeat. It quickly became a definitive ideology, strengthened by its celebratory activities, speeches, clubs, and statues. The major organizations dedicated to maintaining the tradition were the United Confederate Veterans and the United Daughters of the Confederacy. At Natchez, although the local newspapers and veterans played a role in the maintenance of the Lost Cause, elite women particularly were important, especially in establishing memorials such as the Civil War Monument dedicated on Memorial Day 1890. The Lost Cause enabled women noncombatants to lay a claim to the central event in their redefinition of Southern history.

Vicksburg
Vicksburg was the site of the Battle of Vicksburg, a decisive victory as the Union forces gained control of the entire Mississippi River and cut the western states off. The battle consisted of a long siege, which was necessary because the town was on high ground, well fortified, and difficult to attack directly.  The hardships of the civilians were extreme during the siege, with heavy shelling and starvation all around. Some 30,000 Confederates surrendered during the long campaign, but rather than being sent to prison camps, they were paroled and sent home until they could be exchanged for Union prisoners.

Greenville

Greenville was a pivotal village for Grant's northern operations in Mississippi during the Vicksburg campaign. The area of the Delta surrounding Greenville was considered the "breadbasket" for providing Vicksburg's military with corn, hogs, beef, mules and horses. Beginning at the end of March 1863, Greenville was the target of General Frederick Steele's Expedition. The design of this expedition was to reconnoiter Deer Creek as a possible route to Vicksburg and to create havoc and cause damage to confederate soldiers, guerrillas, and loyal (Confederate) landowners. Highly successful, Steele's men seized almost 1000 head of livestock (horses, mules, and cattle) and burned 500,000 bushels of corn during their foray.  In addition to the damage done, the Union soldiers also acquired several hundred slaves, who, wishing to escape the bonds of slavery left their plantations and followed the troops from Rolling Fork back to Greenville.  It was at this time that General Ulysses S. Grant determined that if any of the slaves chose to do so, they could cross the Union lines and become U.S. soldiers. The first black regiments were formed during the Greenville expedition, and by the end of the expedition nearly 500 ex-slaves were learning the "school of the soldier." General Steele's activity in the delta around Greenville pulled the attention of the Confederate leaders away from the Union activities on the Louisiana side of the Mississippi River as they moved on Vicksburg.  More importantly, it had serious consequences for the people and soldiers of Vicksburg who were now deprived of a most important source of supplies, food, and animals.  In early May, as retaliation for Confederate artillery firing on shipping on the Mississippi River, Commander Selfridge of the U.S. Navy ordered ashore 67 marines and 30 sailors, landing near Chicot Island. Their orders were to "put to the torch" all homes and buildings of those citizens guilty of aiding and abetting Confederate forces.  By the end of the day of May 9, the large and imposing mansions, barns, stables, cotton gins, overseer dwellings and slave quarters of the Blanton and Roach plantations were in ruins.  Additional damage was done to Argyle Landing and Chicot Island and other houses, barns and outbuildings.  The destruction of Greenville was completed on May 6 when a number of Union infantrymen slipped ashore from their boats and burned every building in the village but two (a house and a church).

Choctaw County
During the war, Choctaw County Unionists formed a "Loyal League" allied with the U.S. to "break up the war by advising desertion, robbing the families of those who remained in the army, and keeping the Federal authorities advised."

Others
Columbus was an important hospital town early in the war. Columbus also had an arsenal that produced gunpowder as well as cannons and handguns. Columbus was targeted by the Union on at least two different occasions, but Union commanders failed to attack the town, due to the activities of Nathan Bedford Forrest and his men. Many of the casualties from the Battle of Shiloh were brought there, and thousands were buried in the town's Friendship Cemetery. Canton was an important rail and logistics center. Many wounded soldiers were treated in or transported through the city, and, as a consequence, it too has a large Confederate cemetery.

Meridian's strategic position at a major railroad junction made it the home of a Confederate arsenal, military hospital, and prisoner-of-war stockade, as well as the headquarters for a number of state offices. The disastrous Chunky Creek Train Wreck of 1863 happened 30 miles from Meridian, when the train was en route to the Vicksburg battle. After the Vicksburg campaign, Sherman's Union forces turned eastward. In February 1864, his army reached Meridian, where they destroyed the railroads and burned much of the area to the ground. After completing this task, Sherman is reputed to have said, "Meridian no longer exists."

A makeshift shipyard was established on the Yazoo River at Yazoo City after the Confederate loss of New Orleans. The shipyard was destroyed by Union forces in 1863. Then, Yazoo City fell back into Confederate hands. Union forces retook the city the following year and burned most of the buildings in the city.

Battles in Mississippi

 Skirmish at Aberdeen
 Battle of Big Black River Bridge
 Battle of Booneville
 Battle of Brices Cross Roads
 Battle of Champion Hill
 Battle of Chickasaw Bayou
 Siege of Corinth
 Battle of Corinth
 Battle of Grand Gulf
 Battle of Iuka
 Battle of Jackson
 Battle of Meridian
 Battle of Okolona
 Battle of Oxford
 Battle of Port Gibson
 Battle of Raymond
 Burning of Seminary
 Battle of Senatobia
 Battle of Snyder's Bluff
 Battle of Tupelo
 Siege of Vicksburg

Restoration to Union
As stipulated by the Reconstruction Acts during the Reconstruction period, Arkansas and Mississippi were part of the Fourth Military District of the U.S. Army. At various times, the district was commanded by generals Edward Ord, Alvan Cullem Gillem, and Adelbert Ames.

See also 

Confederate States of America - animated map of state secession and confederacy
List of Mississippi Civil War Confederate units
List of Mississippi Union Civil War units
Mississippi Secession Ordinance

References

Further reading

 
 Ballard, Michael B. The Civil War in Mississippi: Major Campaigns and Battles. Jackson, MS: University Press of Mississippi, 2011.
 Barney, William L. The Secessionist Impulse: Alabama and Mississippi in 1860 (University of Alabama Press. 1974).
 Bercaw, Nacy. Gendered Freedoms: Race, Rights, and the Politics of Household in the Delta, 1861–1875 (University Press of Florida, 2003).
 Bettersworth, John K. Confederate Mississippi: The People and Politics of a Cotton State in Wartime. (1943; repr., Philadelphia: Porcupine Press, 1978).
 Bettersworth, John Knox, and James Wesley Silver, eds. Mississippi in the Confederacy: As they saw it, (2 vol. Mississippi Department of Archives and History, Jackson, 1961; reprint 1970).
 Blain, William T. "'Banner' Unionism in Mississippi: Choctaw County: 1861–1869." Mississippi Quarterly 2 (Spring, 1976): 207-220.
 Bond, Bradley G. Political Culture in the Nineteenth Century South: Mississippi, 1830–1900. (LSU Press, 1995).
 Brooks Tomblin, Barbara. The Civil War on the Mississippi: Union Sailors, Gunboat Captains, and the Campaign to Control the River  (University Press of Kentucky, 2016).
 Darst, W. Maury, ed. "The Vicksburg Diary of Mrs. Alfred Ingraham, May 2-June 13, 1863." Journal of Mississippi History 44 (1982): 148-179.
 Dougherty, Kevin. The Vicksburg Campaign: Strategy, Battles and Key Figures (McFarland, 2015).
 Frankel, Noralee. Freedom's women: Black women and families in Civil War era Mississippi (Indiana UP, 1999).
 Frisby, Derek W. Campaigns in Mississippi and Tennessee, February-December 1864 Center of Military History; 2014.
 Galbraith, Loretta and William, eds. A Lost Heroine of the Confederacy: The Diaries and Letters of Belle Edmondson (University of Mississippi Press, 1990).
 Logue, Larry M. "Who Joined the Confederate Army? Soldiers, Civilians, and Communities in Mississippi." Journal of Social History 26#3 (1993): 611-623. in JSTOR
 Pittman, Jr., Walter E. "Trading with the Devil: The Cotton Trade in Civil War Mississippi." Journal of Confederate History 2: 11 (1989): 132-142
 Rainwater, Percy Lee. Mississippi: Storm Center of Secession, 1856–1861 (1938).
 Rowland, Dunbar. Military History of Mississippi, 1803–1898: Taken from the Official and Statistical Register of the State of Mississippi (1908. Reprint Company Publishers, 1978).
 Ruminski, Jarret. "Southern Pride and Yankee Presence: The Limits of Confederate Loyalty in Civil War Mississippi, 1860–1865." (PhD dissertation. University of Calgary, 2013). Bibliography on pp 312–338. online
 Silver, James W., ed. "The Breakdown of Morale in Central Mississippi in 1864: Letters of Judge Robert S. Hudson." Journal of Mississippi History 16 (1964): 99-120.
 Smith, Timothy B. Mississippi in the Civil War: The Home Front. (University Press of Mississippi, 2010). 
 Smith, Timothy B. The Mississippi Secession Convention: Delegates and Deliberations in Politics and War, 1861–1865. (University Press of Mississippi, 2014).
 Whittington, Terry. "In the Shadow of Defeat: Tracking the Vicksburg Parolees." Journal of Mississippi History 4 (Winter, 2002): 307-330.
 Wynne, Ben. Mississippi's Civil War: A Narrative History (Mercer University Press, 2006).

External links

 National Park Service map of Civil War sites in Mississippi

 
.American Civil War
American Civil War by state
American Civil War
 
Western Theater of the American Civil War